MIAC may refer to:

 Ministry of Internal Affairs and Communications, Japan's interior ministry
 Minister for Internal Affairs and Communications, the minister of the above
 Minnesota Indian Affairs Council, a liaison between the government of Minnesota and the Native American tribes in the state
 Minnesota Intercollegiate Athletic Conference, a college athletic conference which competes in the NCAA's Division III
 Missouri Information Analysis Center, a fusion center collecting data from the Department of Homeland Security and local agencies to help Missouri police
 Museum of Indian Arts and Culture, Santa Fe, New Mexico